Strymon bebrycia, the red-lined scrub-hairstreak, is a species of hairstreak in the butterfly family Lycaenidae. It is found in North America.

The MONA or Hodges number for Strymon bebrycia is 4339.

References

Further reading

 

Eumaeini
Articles created by Qbugbot
Butterflies described in 1868